The Asia/Oceania Zone was one of the three zones of the regional Davis Cup competition in 1993.

In the Asia/Oceania Zone there were three different tiers, called groups, in which teams competed against each other to advance to the upper tier. Winners in Group III advanced to the Asia/Oceania Zone Group II in 1994. All other teams remained in Group III.

Participating nations

Draw
 Venue: Khalifa International Tennis and Squash Complex, Doha, Qatar
 Date: 19–25 April

  and  promoted to Group II in 1994.

Results

Bangladesh vs. Bahrain

Saudi Arabia vs. Lebanon

Qatar vs. United Arab Emirates

Singapore vs. Syria

Bangladesh vs. Singapore

Bahrain vs. Syria

Lebanon vs. United Arab Emirates

Qatar vs. Saudi Arabia

Bangladesh vs. United Arab Emirates

Bahrain vs. Saudi Arabia

Lebanon vs. Singapore

Qatar vs. Syria

Bangladesh vs. Syria

Bahrain vs. Singapore

Lebanon vs. Qatar

Saudi Arabia  vs. United Arab Emirates

Bangladesh vs. Qatar

Bahrain vs. Lebanon

Saudi Arabia vs. Singapore

Syria vs. United Arab Emirates

Bangladesh vs. Saudi Arabia

Bahrain vs. United Arab Emirates

Lebanon vs. Syria

Qatar vs. Singapore

Bangladesh vs. Lebanon

Bahrain vs. Qatar

Saudi Arabia vs. Syria

Singapore vs. United Arab Emirates

References

External links
Davis Cup official website

Davis Cup Asia/Oceania Zone
Asia Oceania Zone Group III